Witu may refer to

Kenya
Wituland or Witu Sultanate
Witu, Kenya, capital of Wituland

Papua New Guinea
Vitu language (which is also spelled Witu)
Wiru (disambiguation) (which is also called Witu):
Wiru people
Wiru language

Poland
 Military Institute of Armament Technology (Polish: Wojskowy Instytut Techniczny Uzbrojenia)

Language and nationality disambiguation pages